Iranian Japanese or Japanese Iranian may refer to:
 Iran–Japan relations
 Iranians in Japan
 Japanese people in Iran
 Multiracial people of mixed Iranian and Japanese descent